The hamsa is a palm-shaped amulet popular throughout North Africa and in the Middle East and commonly used in jewellery and wall hangings. Depicting the open right hand, an image recognized and used as a sign of protection in many times throughout history, the hamsa has been traditionally believed to provide defense against the evil eye.

Khamsah is an Arabic word that means "five", but also refers to images of "the five fingers of the hand". In Jewish culture, the hamsa is associated with the number five because of the five fingers depicted on the hand, and because the word khamsa is cognate to the Hebrew ḥamishah (חֲמִישָׁה), which also means "five."

The Hamsa has also been known as the Hand of Fatima after the daughter of Muhammad.

History

Origin 
Early use of the hamsa could be traced to ancient Mesopotamian artifacts in the amulets of the goddess Inanna or Ishtar. The image of the open right hand is also seen in Carthage (modern-day Tunisia) and ancient North Africa and in Phoenician colonies in the Iberian Peninsula (Spain and Portugal). An 8th-century BCE Israelite tomb containing a hamsa-like hand inscription was discovered at Khirbet el-Qom.

Other symbols of divine protection based around the hand include the Hand-of-Venus (or Aphrodite), the Hand-of-Mary, that was used to protect women from the evil eye and/or boost fertility and lactation, promote healthy pregnancies and strengthen the weak. In that time, women were under immense pressure and expectation to become mothers. The woman's upbringing was centered on becoming a mother as an exclusive role, and it indicated childbearing as necessary. It was also thought that marriage was a sense of protection for both the man and the woman.

One theory postulates a connection between the khamsa and the Mano Pantea (or Hand-of-the-All-Goddess), an amulet known to ancient Egyptians as the Two Fingers. In this amulet, the Two Fingers represent Isis and Osiris and the thumb represents their child Horus. It was used to invoke the protective spirits of parents over their child. Another theory traces the origins of the hamsa to Carthage or Phoenicia where the hand (or in some cases vulva) of the supreme deity Tanit was used to ward off the evil eye.

According to Bruno Barbatti, at that time this motive was the most important sign of apotropaic magic in the Islamic world, though many modern representations continue to show an obvious origin from sex symbolism. This relates to the belief that God exists in everything.

Another meaning of this symbol relates to the sky god, Horus. It refers to the Eye of Horus, which means humans cannot escape from the eye of conscience. It says that the sun and moon are the eyes of Horus. The Hand of Fatima also represents femininity and is referred to as the woman's holy hand. It is believed to have extraordinary characteristics that can protect people from evil and other dangers.

Adaptation 
It is speculated that Sephardic Jews were among the first to use this amulet due to their beliefs about the evil eye. The symbol of the hand appears in Kabbalistic manuscripts and amulets, doubling as the Hebrew letter "Shin", the first letter of "Shaddai", one of the names referring to God. The use of the hamsa in Jewish culture has been intermittent, utilized often by Jews during the late nineteenth and early twentieth centuries, then less and less over time into the mid-twentieth century. However, the notion of a protective hand has been present in Judaism dating back to Biblical times, where it is referenced in Deuteronomy 5:15, stated in the Ten Commandments as the "strong hand" of God who led the Jews out of Egypt. The hamsa is later seen in Jewish art as God's hand reaching down from heaven during the times of late antiquity, the Byzantine period, and even medieval Europe. Its use by Ashkenazi Jewish communities from this period is well-known, and evidence has also emerged of the hamsa being used by Jews from medieval Spain, often associated with "sympathetic magic". Historians such as Shalom Sabar believe that after the Jewish expulsion from Spain in 1492, exiled Jews likely used the hamsa as protection in the foreign lands they were forced to relocate to, however this assumption has been difficult to prove. According to Sabar, the hamsa has also been used later by Jews in Europe "as a distinctive sign of the priesthood, especially when they wished to show that a person was of priestly descent...".

The khamsa holds recognition as a bearer of good fortune among Christians in the region as well. Levantine Christians call it the hand of Mary (Arabic: Kef Miryam, or the "Virgin Mary's Hand"). 34 years after the end of Islamic rule in Spain, its use was significant enough to prompt an episcopal committee convened by Emperor Charles V to decree a ban on the Hand of Fatima and all open right hand amulets in 1526.

Symbolism and usage

The Hand (Khamsa), particularly the open right hand, is a sign of protection that also represents blessings, power and strength, and is seen as potent in deflecting the evil eye. One of the most common components of gold and silver jewellery in the region, historically and traditionally, it was most commonly carved in jet or formed from silver, a metal believed to represent purity and hold magical properties. It is also painted in red (sometimes using the blood of a sacrificed animal) on the walls of houses for protection, or painted or hung on the doorways of rooms, such as those of an expectant mother or new baby. The hand can be depicted with the fingers spread apart to ward off evil, or as closed together to bring good luck. Similarly, it can be portrayed with the fingers pointing up in warding, or down to bestow blessings. Highly stylized versions may be difficult to recognize as hands, and can consist of five circles representing the fingers, situated around a central circle representing the palm.

Used to protect against evil eye, a malicious stare believed to be able to cause illness, death or just general unluckiness, hamsas often contain an eye symbol. Depictions of the hand, the eye or the number five in Arabic (and Berber) tradition are related to warding off the evil eye, as exemplified in the saying khamsa fi ainek ("five [fingers] in your eye"). Raising one's right hand with the palm showing and the fingers slightly apart is part of this curse meant "to blind the aggressor". Another formula uttered against the evil eye in Arabic, but without hand gestures, is khamsa wa-khamis ("five and Thursday"). As the fifth day of the week, Thursday is considered a good day for magic rites and pilgrimages to the tombs of revered saints to counteract the effects of the evil eye.

Due to its significance in both Arabic and Berber culture, the hamsa is one of the national symbols of Algeria and appears in its emblem. It is also the most popular among the different amulets (such as the Eye and the Hirz—a silver box containing verses of the Quran) for warding off the evil eye in Egypt. Egyptian women who live in baladi ("traditional") urban quarters often make khamaysa, which are amulets made up of five (khamsa) objects to attach to their children's hair or black aprons. The five objects can be made of peppers, hands, circles or stars hanging from hooks.

Although significant in Arab and Berber culture, Jewish people have long interpreted and adopted the symbol of the hand with great importance since the Ten Commandments. A portion of these commandments states that the "Lord took Israel out of Egypt with a strong hand and an outstretched arm". The "strong hand" is representative of the hamsa which rooted its relevance in the community then. The helping hand exemplified God's willingness to help his people and direct them out of struggle. Around the time of the Byzantine period, artists would depict God's hand reaching from up above. God's hand from heaven would lead the Jewish people out of struggle, and the Jews quickly made a connection with the hamsa and their culture. The hand was identified in Jewish text and acquired as an influential icon throughout the community.

Amongst the Jewish people, the hamsa is a very respected, holy, and common symbol. It has sometimes been used as decoration for the Ketubah, or marriage contracts, as well as items that dress the Torah such as pointers, and the Passover Haggadah. The use of the hand as images both in and out of the synagogue suggests the importance and relevance that the Jewish people associated with the hamsa. The hand decorated some of the most religious and divine objects and has since emerged from its uncommon phase.

At the time of the establishment of the State of Israel, the hamsa became a symbol in everyday Israeli life, and to a degree, a symbol of Israel itself. It has come to be a symbol of secularity, and a trendy talisman; a "good luck" charm appearing on necklaces, keychains, postcards, telephone and lottery cards, and in advertisements. It is also a commonly used symbol by Jews outside of the Middle East, particularly in Jewish communities of the United States. It is also incorporated into high-end jewellery, decorative tilework and wall decorations. 

Similar to the Western use of the phrase "knock on wood" or "touch wood", a common expression in Israel is "Hamsa, Hamsa, Hamsa, tfu, tfu, tfu", the sound for spitting, supposedly to spit out bad luck.

At the Mimouna, a Maghrebi Jewish celebration held after Passover, tables are laid with various symbols of luck and fertility, with an emphasis on the number "5", such as five pieces of gold jewellery or five beans arranged on a leaf of pastry. The repetition of the number five is associated with the hamsa amulet.

In Morocco, the Hamsa is called 'Khamsa' or 'Khmisa' and is widely used as a protection from bad luck and evil people. The Hamsa is incorporated in many home decor items, but still, the most common use is in jewellery. Most Moroccan women have at least one jewellery piece with a Hamsa.

A symbol  was added to Unicode in 2021 (Unicode 14.0, Emoji 14.0).

See also
 Hand of God (art)
 Abhayamudra
 Evil eye
 Filakto
 Nazar
 Skandola

References

Citations

Bibliography

 
 
 
 
 
 
 
 
 Lenhart, Sandy (2011).  "Hand of Fatima Meaning - Origin and Variations". Ezine Articles. February 17, 2011.

External links 
 

Amulets
Objects believed to protect from evil
Christian symbols
Fatimah
Islam and Judaism
Jewish symbols
Buddhist symbols
Mary, mother of Jesus
National symbols of Algeria
National symbols of Tunisia
Hand
Inanna